The San Francisco International Arts Festival (SFIAF) is a multicultural performance and visual arts festival held annually in late May and early June at Fort Mason Center for Arts and Culture in San Francisco, California. SFIAF presents the work of ground-breaking performing artists from the Bay Area and around the world; many of the international artists do not have US representation and have rarely (or never previously) performed in this country. From 2003 to 2020 SFIAF and more than 100 presenting partners have coordinated, presented and/or produced performances by over 400 artists and arts ensembles from the Bay Area and 57 other countries, as well as conducting numerous educational and outreach activities.

History
The first SFIAF was held between September 4 to 21, 2003 at Yerba Buena Center for the Arts. A total of 15 ensembles performed at the festival, eight of which were from the San Francisco Bay Area and seven were from abroad. Of these, Akram Khan Dance Company (London), Salia nï Seydou (Burkina Faso), and Quasar Companhia de Danca (Brazil) all made their northern California debuts. The second SFIAF was held between May 18 to June 5, 2005, and presented a total of 23 productions, four  by international artists, six as international collaborations of local artists working with artists from other countries, and 13 by local artists. Beginning with the 2005 season, SFIAF has  been held in late May and early June. In its early years, before the festival made Fort Mason its principal venue in 2009, SFIAF presented shows at a number of different venues throughout San Francisco, including the Yerba Buena Center for the Arts, Theater Artaud, Mission High School, and Fort Mason. Beginning with the 2015 season that was held from May 21 to June 7 and that showcased performances by 70 local and international ensembles, all performances have been staged at Fort Mason Center for Arts and Culture. The 2020 Festival was cancelled due to the coronavirus pandemic.

Recent seasons
The 2018 season of SFIAF took place at Fort Mason Center for Arts and Culture between May 24 and June 3 and showcased some 40 local and international artists and ensembles. Commemorating the 50th anniversary of Martin Luther King Jr.'s assassination, the festival's theme was Down by the Riverside. The headline concert 'Down by the Riverside: Requiem for a King,' a composition by Anthony Brown with spoken word by Angela Davis saw its world-premier on May 26 in Fort Mason's Cowell Theater. The 2019 season of SFIAF took place from May 23 to June 2 at Fort Mason Center for Arts and Culture, showcasing some 50 local and international artists and ensembles. Themed The Path to Democracy, the festival presented a number of productions that directly or indirectly engaged with political activism, such as Théatre de la Feuille's (Hong Kong) new adaptation of 'The Orphan of Zhao' or Spitfire Company's (Czech Republic) 'Antiwords', inspired by the late Václav Havel's play 'Audience'. Two of the companies that had originally been scheduled to appear at this year's festival, the Compagnie Virginie Brunelle, a modern dance group based in Montreal, Canada, and Collective Ma’louba, a Syrian theater company based in Germany, were denied visas to the US and their shows had to be cancelled.

Productions 
SFIAF is primarily a presenting organization but has also produced projects over the years. These productions include:

2005-7 “A Long Way Home: Concertizing the Golden Triangle” composed and arranged by Linda Tillery & The Cultural Heritage Choir with Black Voices (UK).
2008-10 “Crazy Cloud” by Shinichi Iova-Koga and inkBoat in collaboration with Ko Murobushi (Japan).
2009-12 “PLACAS: The Most Dangerous Tattoo” written by Paul S. Flores, directed by Michael John Garces, starring Ric Salinas.
2013-15 “Classic Black” written by/starring Devorah Major with Brian Freeman, directed by Ellen Sebastian Chang.
2016-18 “IYA: The Esselen Remember” (staged readings) written by Luis Juarez of Baktun 12 in collaboration with the Ohlone Costanoan Esselen Nation, directed by Kinan Valdez.
2020-22 “Daughters of the Delta” composed by Michelle Jacques and Cava Menzies with arrangements by Bryan Dyer.

References

External links
 
 

Art festivals in the United States
Art in San Francisco
2003 establishments in California
Festivals established in 2003
Festivals in the San Francisco Bay Area